The Wellington and Napoleon Quartet is a historical fiction series of novels by Simon Scarrow set in primarily the time of the French Revolution and the Napoleonic Wars. The series tells the stories of Napoleon Bonaparte and Arthur Wellesley from their births to the climax of their respective military careers, the Battle of Waterloo.

Titles in series
Young Bloods
The Generals
Fire and Sword
The Fields of Death

 
Novels by Simon Scarrow
Historical novels
Novel series